Hathaway Brown, commonly referred to as HB, is an all-girls private school located in Shaker Heights, Ohio.  The school serves pre-kindergarten through 12th grade students.

Hathaway Brown is a member of the National Coalition of Girls' Schools, National Association of Independent Schools, and Cleveland Council of Independent Schools.

History
Founded in 1876, Hathaway Brown began as "afternoon classes for young ladies" at the all-boys private Brooks Military School in downtown Cleveland. Its original name was the Brooks School for Ladies. In 1886, the school was purchased by Anne Hathaway Brown. During her tenure, Brown changed the school's name to “Miss Anne H. Hathaway Brown's School for Girls” and introduced the school motto: non scholae sed vita discimus (“we learn not for school but for life”). At that point, only women were accepted.

The building at 1945 East 97th Street was completed in 1905 by the Cleveland architectural firm of Hubbell & Benes. It was later demolished. The school moved to its current location at 19600 North Park Boulevard in Shaker Heights. Mary Elizabeth Raymond (1912–38) and Ann Cutter Coburn (1938–68) were notable headmistresses.

The head of the school is Mary Frances Bisselle.

Ohio High School Athletic Association team state championships

 Girls Basketball - 2009, 2010, 2011, 2012, 2013
 Girls Field Hockey - 2008, 2002
 Girls Soccer - 2009, 2007, 2004
 Girls Golf - 2010
 Girls Tennis -2013, 2014, 2015, 2016, 2017, 2018, 2019

Other non-sanctioned state championships:
Girls Tennis -2003, 2004
Girls Lacrosse-2010, 2012

Accreditation and membership
 Founding Member, National Coalition of Girls Schools
 Independent School Association of Central States, State of Ohio
 Member, National Association of Independent Schools

References

Girls' schools in Ohio
High schools in Cuyahoga County, Ohio
Shaker Heights, Ohio
Private high schools in Ohio
Private middle schools in Ohio
Private elementary schools in Ohio
Private K-12 schools in the United States